The 2010 season in Swedish football, started January 2010 and ended December 2010:

Honours

Official titles

Competitions

Promotions, relegations and qualifications

Promotions

Relegations

International qualifications

Domestic results

2010 Allsvenskan

2010 Allsvenskan qualification play-off

2010 Superettan

2010 Superettan qualification play-off

2010 Division 1 Norra

2010 Division 1 Södra

2010 Svenska Cupen 

Quarter-finals

Semi-finals

Final

2010 Supercupen 

Final

National team results

Notes

References 
Online

 
Seasons in Swedish football